Ride West was the seventh Korean-language studio album by South Korean girl group Baby V.O.X. It was released on April 16, 2004, by DR Music and EMI. It was the last album before officially disbanding and it has sold 80,000 copies.

Track listing 
 Intro
 Xcstasy (English Version)
 Xcstasy (Korean Version)
 Xcstasy (remix)
 Play Remix (English Version)
 Play Remix (Korean Version)
 Play Remix (Extended Version)
 The First and Last
 Move Your Body
 I Want You Back
 I'm Still Loving You (Chinese version)
 Go (Japanese Version)
 O.S.T (Father & I)

Personnel 
Kim E-Z
Shim Eun-Jin
Kan Mi-Youn
Yoon Eun-Hye
Lee Hee-Jin

2004 albums
DR Music albums
Baby V.O.X. albums